Flight 400 may refer to:

TWA Flight 400, crashed on 1 April 1956
Spantax Flight 400, crashed on 5 March 1973

0400